Skunkha, was king of the  ("Saka who wear pointed caps"), a group of the Saka, in the 6th century BC.

Name

Capture
In 519 BC, Darius I of Achaemenids attacked the Saka tribe and captured their king. His capture is depicted in the relief sculpture of Behistun Inscription, last in a row of defeated "lying kings".  After his defeat, Darius replaced him with the chief of another tribe.

References

6th-century BC rulers
Saka people
Iranian rulers
Massagetae
6th-century BC Iranian people